Cathal Cregg is a footballer from County Roscommon, Ireland. He has played with Roscommon at all levels and helped them to win the 2010 Connacht Senior Football Championship.He played for the  Ireland international rules team in 2014.

References

Living people
1978 births
Connacht inter-provincial Gaelic footballers
Roscommon inter-county Gaelic footballers
Western Gaels Gaelic footballers
DCU Gaelic footballers